Chiloglanis asymetricaudalis is a species of upside-down catfish native to Burundi, the Democratic Republic of the Congo, Rwanda and Tanzania where it can be found in the Rusizi and Luiche Rivers.  This species grows to a length of  SL.

References

External links 

asymetricaudalis
Freshwater fish of Africa
Fish of Burundi
Fish of the Democratic Republic of the Congo
Fish of Rwanda
Fish of Tanzania
Taxonomy articles created by Polbot
Fish described in 1993